The House of Zierotin or House of Žerotín was a Czech noble family in the Lands of the Bohemian Crown, one of the oldest and most illustrious noble families from Bohemia and Moravia. The family was first mentioned around the year 1200 as Bludovici (Blud of Bludov), later renamed Žerotínové, and achieved the rank of Imperial Counts in the Holy Roman Empire. The male line of this family died out in 1985. Its estates, manor Bludov, were returned to their female descendants, the family Mornstein-Zierotin after fall of Communist rule in 1989.

History
According to romantic legend, the Zierotins were the offspring of Prince Oleg of Drelinia, brother of Vladimir I of Kiev, and therefore the family uses in its coat of arms a royal crown (or more properly the crown of Grand Prince) and  princely mantling. The heraldic device is a blazon of arms in gules (red) with a lion sable (black), crowned, on three mountains argent (silver). The crest is the crowned lion rampant.

Members of the family were judges, governors, patrons of art, and politicians. The most famous is Karel Older of Zierotin (1564–1636), head of the Moravian nobility during the Thirty Years' War, a friend of Henry IV of France and brother-in-law of Albrecht of Wallenstein. Other interesting members were Johan Karl von Zierotin (1719–1776) directeur des spectacles of Frederick II of Prussia and friend of Johann Sebastian Bach, Karel Emanuel of Zierotin (1850–1934), peer of the Austrian Empire and governor of Moravia (1900–1906), and Ladislav Velen of Zierotin (1579–1638), head of the uprising against the Habsburgs.

The male line of this family died out in 1985. Its estates, manor Bludov, were returned to their female descendants, the family Mornstein-Zierotin after the fall of the Communist rule (1989).

Notes

References
History of Bludov (in Czech)
Family coat of arms
Vincenc Brandl, Spisy Karla st. ze Žerotína, 3 vols, Brno 1870–1972. On line text
Chlumecky, Peter Ritter von: Carl von Zierotin und seine Zeit: 1564–1615. Brünn 1862.
KALISTA, Zdeněk. Čechové, kteří tvořili dějiny světa. Praha : Garamond, 2009. 198 s. .
KNOZ, Tomáš. Državy Karla staršího ze Žerotína po Bílé hoře. Osoby, příběhy, struktury. Brno : Matice moravská ; Masarykova univerzita, 2001. 474 s. .
KNOZ, Tomáš. in Osobnosti moravských dějin (1) s.203-218. Brno : Matice moravská, 2006. 516 s. .
KNOZ, Tomáš. Karel starší ze Žerotína. Don Quijote v labyrintu světa. Praha : Vyšehrad, 2008. 365 p. .
ODLOŽILÍK, Otakar. Karel starší ze Žerotína. 1564–1636. Praha : Melantrich, 1936. 197 p.
HRUBÝ, František. Ladislav Velen ze Žerotína. Praha : [s.n.], 1930.
Documentary about the House

Moravian noble families
Bohemian noble families
Austrian noble families